Barbara Habberjam is a prominent English translator of Gilles Deleuze's works. She often collaborates with the translator Hugh Tomlinson.

Prior to working as a translator, she had worked as a diplomat in both France and Russia.

References

British translators
French–English translators
Living people
British women writers
Year of birth missing (living people)
Place of birth missing (living people)